Trichochermes is a genus of true bugs belonging to the family Triozidae.

The species of this genus are found in Eurasia.

Species:
 Trichochermes certus Loginova, 1964 
 Trichochermes grandis Loginova, 1965 
 Trichochermes walkeri (Foerster, 1848)

References

Triozidae
Taxa named by George Willis Kirkaldy